Bode Uale was the first family court judge appointed in the United States who was of Samoan descent. Uale currently serves as the lead judge of the Honolulu Family Court's Domestic Division.

He was raised in Laie, Hawaii and graduated in 1979 from Brigham Young University–Hawaii with a degree in political science. He later earned a Juris Doctor in 1984 from the University of Hawaiʻi. He worked as a public defender from 1984 to 1989 and practiced private law from 1989 to 1991. He was appointed as a family court judge by Chief Justice Herman Lum in 1991. His current assignment is as Lead Judge of the Domestic Division of the Honolulu Family Court. He is also an advisory board member for the “Imi Ho’ola” Minority Admissions Program for the School of Medicine at the University of Hawaii. He participates in an innovative family drug court program that helps parents put their families back together.

Aside from his position as a judge, Uale served as the president of the Honolulu Hawaii Stake of the Church of Jesus Christ of Latter-day Saints.

Uale and his wife Beth are the parents of four children, most notably Andria Tupola. Beth was recognized as Hawaii mother of the year in 2004.

Notes

Brigham Young University–Hawaii alumni
William S. Richardson School of Law alumni
Living people
Hawaii state court judges
American leaders of the Church of Jesus Christ of Latter-day Saints
American people of Samoan descent
Public defenders
Latter Day Saints from Hawaii
Year of birth missing (living people)